The Ubaldo Fillol Award (from the Spanish: Premio Ubaldo Fillol), was a football award that went to the goalkeeper with the lowest goals-to-games ratio of each tournament of the Argentine Primera División. The award was created by Argentine World Cup winning goalkeeper Ubaldo Fillol (considered by some journalists as the best Argentine goalkeeper ever) in 2008, and was named after him. Since the 2009 Clausura tournament, the Argentine Football Association recognized the award as official.

Rules 
To win the award, a goalkeeper had to play at least 14 games in the tournament (over the 19 possible). Only matches in which the goalkeeper played at least 60 minutes were accounted. The result obtained from dividing the total goals conceded by the total games played by the keeper determined the standings, with the lowest average winning the award. In case more than one goalkeeper shared the lowest average, the winner was the one who had played more games. If that did not break the tie, it would be defined via an online opinion poll in Ubaldo Fillol's official website.

Winners 
Keys

References

Argentine Primera División trophies and awards
Association football trophies and awards